Pierre François Verhulst (28 October 1804, Brussels – 15 February 1849, Brussels) was a Belgian mathematician and a doctor in number theory from the University of Ghent in 1825. He is best known for the logistic growth model.

Logistic equation

Verhulst developed the logistic function in a series of three papers between 1838 and 1847, based on research on modeling population growth that he conducted in the mid 1830s, under the guidance of Adolphe Quetelet; see  for details.

Verhulst published in  the equation:

In this equation, the population equilibrium (sometimes referred to as the carrying capacity, K), is
.

In  he named the solution the logistic curve.

Later, Raymond Pearl and Lowell Reed popularized the equation, but with a presumed equilibrium, K, as

where K sometimes represents the maximum number of individuals that the environment can support.  In relation to the density-dependent crowding effect, .  The Pearl-Reed logistic equation can be integrated exactly, and has solution

where C = 1/N(0) − 1/K is determined by the initial condition N(0).  The solution can also be written as a weighted harmonic mean of the initial condition and the carrying capacity,

Although the continuous-time logistic equation is often compared to the logistic map because of similarity of form, it is actually more closely related to the Beverton–Holt model of fisheries recruitment.

The concept of R/K selection theory derives its name from the competing dynamics of exponential growth and carrying capacity introduced by the equations above.

See also
Population dynamics
Logistic map
Logistic distribution

Works

References 

 
 Published as:

External links
 

1804 births
1849 deaths
Belgian mathematicians
19th-century male writers